Apedolepis (meaning "flat scale", from Greek ἄπεδοςi, apedos, meaning 'even', 'flat', or 'level' and λεπίς, meaning 'scale') was an extinct genus of early jawless fish known from the Ordovician Stokes Formation of central Australia. All existing material was collected in the Areyonga Creek section of the eastern Gardiner Range. Apedolepis is known solely from scales, with the type specimen (CPC 33630) consisting of a single scale.

References

Ordovician jawless fish
Prehistoric fish of Australia
Prehistoric jawless fish genera